James Edward Winston Langwith (20 April 1945 – 26 September 2020), known professionally as Jimmy Winston, was an English musician and actor. He was the original keyboard player with Small Faces. Winston had apparently previously worked under the stage name James Moody.

His acting credits include the 1968 stage musical Hair and the 1972 Doctor Who serial Day of the Daleks.

Small Faces 
In early 1965, Winston, along with his acquaintance Steve Marriott, formed Small Faces with Ronnie Lane and Kenney Jones. While originally a guitarist, his role was soon shifted to become a keyboardist. Winston was fundamental in the band's emergence, as his parents owned the Ruskin Arms pub located in Manor Park, a place where the group would rehearse and occasionally perform. After a performance at the Cavern Club on Leicester Square, an assistant of manager Don Arden stepped up to the band and managed to secure them a contract with Decca Records. The band released their debut single "Whatcha Gonna Do About It" later that year, peaking at number 14. The success of this single would be followed by "I've Got Mine", which despite good reviews failed to chart. The group including Winston performed the song in Dateline Diamonds (1965). Shortly after this release, Winston left the group, and was promptly replaced by Ian McLagan.

A factor that has been rumoured about his termination is that during an episode of Thank Your Lucky Stars, Winston snubbed Marriott. There has been controversy whether Winston left the group himself or was fired. Lane stated in an interview that he was fired:
However, Kenney Jones later said: "He [Winston] got above his station and tried to compete with Steve Marriott."

Death 
Winston died on 26 September 2020, at the age of 75.

Discography

Solo 
"Sun In the Morning" / "Just Wanna Smile" (1976)

with Small Faces 
(While he is credited as the sole keyboardist on their first two singles, Winston is also credited on some tracks on four further albums released by the band)
 "Whatcha Gonna Do About It" / "What's A Matter Baby" (1965)
 "I've Got Mine" / "It's Too Late" (1965)
 Small Faces (1966)
 From the Beginning (1967)
 The Autumn Stone (1969)
 The BBC Sessions (1999)

with Jimmy Winston and His Reflections 

"Sorry She's Mine" / "It's Not What You Do (But the Way That You Do It)" (1966)

with Winston's Fumbs 
"Real Crazy Apartment" / "Snow White" (1967)

Filmography

References

External links
 
 
 Entries at 45cat.com
 

1945 births
2020 deaths
English keyboardists
English rock keyboardists
People from Stratford, London
British rhythm and blues boom musicians
Small Faces members
20th-century English male actors
English male film actors
English male television actors
Male actors from London
Musicians from London